The AG200 is a motorcycle made by Yamaha for use in agriculture, military, humanitarian aid and other rural professional use. It is only available in select markets, including Africa, Australia, Latin America and New Zealand.

The AG200 ships stock with numerous unusual components aimed at utility and survivability, including 
 Dual side stands with enlarged "feet"
 Sealed drum brakes
 Front and extended rear cargo racks
 Encased drive chain
 Crash bars on the handlebars, engine and chain
 Clutch lock
 N-1-2-3-4-5 gear arrangement

See also
Yamaha AG100
Yamaha AG175

References

External links
AG200 at Yamaha Motor Global

TW200
Dual-sport motorcycles
Motorcycles introduced in 1987